Kenji Dai (代 健司, born March 27, 1989) is a Japanese football player.

Club statistics
Updated to 20 February 2020.

References

External links
Profile at Kataller Toyama
Profile at Renofa Yamaguchi

1989 births
Living people
Fukuoka University alumni
Association football people from Hiroshima Prefecture
Japanese footballers
J2 League players
J3 League players
Japan Football League players
Mito HollyHock players
Ehime FC players
Renofa Yamaguchi FC players
Kataller Toyama players
Tegevajaro Miyazaki players
Association football defenders